The 1918 SAPFL season was the 3rd and final season of the South Australian Patriotic Football League, a competition formed in the absence of the South Australian Football League during World War I. The SAFL was opposed to the formation of the Patriotic League and refused to recognise it during and after World War I.

Ladder

References

SAFL